The Michael A. Dornheim Award is presented in honor of the late Michael Dornheim, a longtime reporter and editor at Aviation Week & Space Technology magazine.

The award is presented annually as part of the National Press Club's journalism awards, which recognizes and honors professional journalists for their outstanding work for the public, either independently or as employees of editorially-independent news and media entities. The recipient must be a working journalist writing about aerospace, defense, the airline industry, or aerospace science and engineering. Entrants may enter up to 6 examples of work, and the winner receives a $1,000 prize.

Winners

Namesake
Michael A. Dornheim (1954–2006) was a journalist at Aviation Week for more than two decades. After a dinner with friends on June 3, 2006, he drove away from the restaurant, suggesting he would take "the back way." Nine days later, law enforcement officials found Dornheim's car had run off the road and descended 350 feet. Landing inverted, Dornheim was found deceased at the scene.

Dornheim was awarded two more writing awards posthumously.

Notes

References

Aviation awards
Journalism awards
Awards established in 2008